Scott Schwartz (born May 12, 1968) is an American actor best known for his roles as a child actor in The Toy, A Christmas Story and Kidco.

Life and career 
Schwartz co-starred opposite Richard Pryor and Jackie Gleason in 1982's The Toy directed by Richard Donner. In 1982, Schwartz filmed Kidco directed by Ronald F. Maxwell.  In 1983, he featured in the Christmas film A Christmas Story as Flick, who got his tongue stuck to a frozen flagpole.  In 1985, Schwartz co-starred with Liza Minnelli, Corey Haim, and Jeffrey DeMunn in the television film A Time to Live.

Schwartz grew up in Bridgewater Township, New Jersey, and attended Eisenhower Junior High School. He attended high school in 1982–1983 and 1985–1986 at Bridgewater-Raritan High School West in Bridgewater, with future professional basketball player Eric Murdock. He moved on to attend the Professional Children's School from 1983 to 1985.

Since 1987, he has managed a sports and movie memorabilia collectibles store, Sports and Movie Stuff, with his father Dan Schwartz in Simi Valley, California. Schwartz' father was Elvis Presley's US Army company clerk in Germany from 1958 to 1960.

In the 1990s, Schwartz worked in the adult film industry in minor, non-sexual roles, and behind the scenes in numerous administrative roles.  Schwartz would eventually star in adult films in sexual roles. After appearing in more than a dozen films in a non-sexual capacity, he quit in 2000.

Since 2006, Schwartz has pursued his acting career, and helped create a line of celebrity-based trading cards for Donruss. He has also obtained celebrity autographs for companies such as: Upper Deck, Razor, Leaf, and In the Game. In 2008, Schwartz began writing for the sports card magazine Beckett, and was featured on the cover of the September 2008 issue of Sports Card Monthly alongside Darren McFadden and Josh Hamilton.

In the wake of his former castmate Corey Haim's death in March 2010, Schwartz sold Haim's personal belongings on eBay at the behest of the Haim family. Schwartz is also president of A Minor Consideration, a child actors' advocacy organization established in 1990 by actor Paul Petersen.

Schwartz reprised his role as Flick in the A Christmas Story sequel, A Christmas Story Christmas for Warner Bros. Pictures and HBO Max.

Filmography

Television

References

External links 

1968 births
American male child actors
American male pornographic film actors
Male actors from Nevada
People from Bridgewater Township, New Jersey
Pornographic film actors from Nevada
Living people